Jean-Paul Bonnaire (3 October 1943 - 28 March 2013) was a French actor. He appeared in more than one hundred films from 1975 to 2013.

Selected filmography

References

External links 

1943 births
2013 deaths
French male film actors